Shi Xiu is a fictional character in Water Margin, one of the Four Great Classical Novels in Chinese literature. Nicknamed "Daredevil Third Brother", he ranks 33rd among the 36 Heavenly Spirits, the first third of the 108 Stars of Destiny.

Background
Brought up in Jiankang Prefecture, which is present-day Nanjing in Jiangsu, Shi Xiu is a tall, muscular, and good-looking young man, who has learnt martial arts since childhood. Intolerant of bullying, he often jumps into frays to help the party being victimised,  even at the risk of his own life. He is thus nicknamed "Daredevil Third Brother".  He travels around with his uncle, a tradesman always on the move. After his uncle died, he suffers losses and could not afford the journey home. He ends up in Jizhou (薊州; present-day Ji County, Tianjin), where he makes a living by selling firewood.

Meeting Yang Xiong
One day, when passing a busy street carrying firewood, Shi Xiu comes upon Yang Xiong, the chief warden of Jizhou's prison, being attacked by a group of hooligans. Yang has just executed a prisoner and is showered with gifts by cheering onlookers as he heads back to office. Coveting the gifts, the thugs pretend to greet him and then lunge forth to restrain him. Seeing that Yang is ambushed and outnumbered, Shi plunges into the scuffle and helps him drive away the attackers. Grateful to Shi Xiu, Yang Xiong requests that they become sworn brothers.

Yang Xiong invites Shi Xiu to live with him and sets up a meat shop for him to run. Shi Xiu is sharp-eyed and soon detects that Yang's wife Pan Qiaoyun is having a secret affair with the monk Pei Ruhai. He informs Yang Xiong about it. However, Yang goes to dine with his colleagues after the tip-off and in a drunken state chastises his wife for being unchaste when he gets home. He forgets the scolding the next day, which allows the woman to turn the table on Shi Xiu before Yang questions her. She lies that she has rejected Shi's advances, inducing Yang to conclude that Shi has bad-mouthed her so as to save himself. Believing his wife, Yang signals to Shi that their ties are severed by closing the meat shop. Knowing he has been maligned, Shi is determined to clear his name.

One night, Shi Xiu ambushes and kills Pei Ruhai in a deserted lane outside Yang Xiong's house when the monk is leaving it after a tryst with Pan. He then takes the monk's robe and other personal effects to show to Yang Xiong. Now quite convinced by Shi, Yang Xiong lures Pan Qiaoyun to Mount Cuiping (翠屏山; in present-day Jizhou, Hebei) under the pretext of visiting his ancestors' graves. On the hill, he and Shi Xiu confront her and demand she tells the truth. Scared, Pan admits her wrongdoings. Instigated by Shi, Yang kills her as well as her maid, who has acted as a lookout in the adultery.

Becoming an outlaw
Yang Xiong and Shi Xiu decide to seek refuge at the outlaw stronghold of Liangshan Marsh. They are joined by Shi Qian, who has chanced upon the killings while stealing from graves at Mount Cuiping. Along the way, they rest in an inn owned by the Zhu Family Manor. Shi Qian steals the inn's only rooster to cook for meal as the place has nothing nice to offer, sparking off a fight between the three and the innkeeper. Shi Xiu burns down the inn as the innkeeper fetches men to seize them. Shi Qian is caught in a trap as they flee. Yang  Xiong and Shi Xiu stumble into the neighbouring Li Family Manor, where they run into Du Xing, who has once received help from Yang in Jizhou. Du takes them to his master Li Ying, who agrees to help them seek the release of Shi Qian. Li writes two consecutive letters to the Zhu Family Manor asking them to free the man, but the Zhus refuse both times. When Li Ying goes to confront them, he is injured by an arrow. Yang Xiong and Shi Xiu then proceed to Liangshan, their only hope to save Shi Qian.

Before the first battle between Liangshan and the Zhu Family Manor, Shi Xiu sneaks into the village disguised as a firewood seller. He finds out how to navigate the maze of roads winding among trees outside the manor from an aged villager. That lead helps the force of Song Jiang to get out when they lose their way among the trees in the first offensive. When the Zhus are not completely convinced that Sun Li has come to help them, Shi Xiu seals their trust by pretending to be captured by Sun in a one-on-one combat on horseback. When the Zhus lower their guard, Sun Li and his group attack them from within their ranks, seizing victory for Liangshan.

Attempt to save Lu Junyi

The story of Lu Junyi, a wealthy squire and a consummate fighter, starts with Liangshan setting him up to appear to be a rebel against the government. Lu is arrested in Daming prefecture, where he lives, and is sentenced to exile at Shamen Island. Lu's steward Li Gu, who takes over his property as well as his wife, bribes his two escorts to murder him on the way. But Lu is rescued by his servant Yan Qing, who kills the two guards. However, Lu, weak from days of torture, is caught again in an inn when Yan goes look for food. This time Grand Secretary Liang Shijie, the governor of Daming, immediately sentences him to death. Meanwhile, Yan Qing, who is rushing to Liangshan to seek help, runs into Yang Xiong and Shi Xiu, who are going to Daming to check on Lu. Yang returns to Liangshan with Yan while Shi Xiu continues on to Daming. Shi is shocked to learn that Lu is to be beheaded soon. He goes to the second floor of a restaurant where he could overlook the execution ground. Just as Cai Fu, the executioner, is about to chop off Lu's head, Shi Xiu leaps off from the building, shouting "Liangshan fighters are all here!", which stuns everyone at the scene. Personally slaying dozens of soldiers, policemen, and security guards, he successfully drags Lu away through the panicked crowd. But they are eventually outnumbered and captured.

When Shi Xiu is brought before Liang Shijie, he berates the official in a booming voice, calling him "a slave of a slave's slave". Shocked by Shi's fearless look and defiant words, Liang decides to keep them alive as they could be used as bargaining chips if Liangshan attacks. After some fruitless battles with Daming, Liangshan sends some chieftains to infiltrate the city on the night of Lantern Festival. They break into the jail and rescue Shi and Lu.

Death
Shi Xiu is appointed as one of the leaders of the Liangshan infantry after the 108 Stars of Destiny came together in what is called the Grand Assembly. He participates in the campaigns against the Liao invaders and rebel forces in Song territory following amnesty from Emperor Huizong for Liangshan.

In the battle of Yuling Pass (昱嶺關; near present-day Zhupu Village, She County, Anhui) in the campaign against Fang La, Shi Xiu is shot dead in an ambush by the archers of Pang Wanchun.

References
 
 }
 
 
 
 
 

36 Heavenly Spirits
Fictional characters from Jiangsu